X Games Minneapolis 2017 is an action sporting event that took place July 13–16, 2017, at U.S. Bank Stadium in downtown Minneapolis, Minnesota.

This Summer X Games was the first held in the Midwest and the first of two X Games events to be held in the state of Minnesota with another planned for the following summer in 2018. The games were televised by ESPN and ABC.

Bids
After the three-year agreement with Circuit of the Americas, ESPN opened up a bid process to any US city that meet the event requirements to host the 2017 and 2018 Summer X Games.

Minneapolis beat out several other cities including Fort Lauderdale, Florida (BB&T Center), Providence, Rhode Island, and Long Island, New York, after Austin, Texas served as the host the past three games.

Detroit, Michigan was seen a front-runner for these games as they were a past runner-up, however they did not submit a bid due to a scheduling issue with Ford Field and Joe Louis Arena.

Other cities that had interest included Charlotte, North Carolina at Charlotte Motor Speedway and Chicago, Illinois.

Day by day

Thursday
The games began on Thursday, July 13, 2017. Three final events were held this day. Starting off was the BMX Vert Final, where Australian Vince Byron won gold, edging out the United Kingdom's Jamie Bestwick. The second final of the day, the Skateboard Vert Final, ended with Moto Shibata winning the gold, becoming the first Japanese competitor to win a gold medal at the X Games. In the final event of the day, American Sammy Halbert won the Harley-Davidson Flat Track event.

Friday
On Friday, July 14, four event finals were held. The first final was the BMX Street Final, which concluded with American Garrett Reynolds capturing the gold. Following that final came the Women's Skateboard Street Final, where fifteen year old Japanese skateboarder Aori Nishimura obtained the gold medal. The final events continued with the BMX Big Air Final, which resulted in American James Foster receiving gold. The day concluded with the Moto X Freestyle final, which saw New Zealand's Levi Sherwood capture his first gold medal at the X Games.

Saturday
Saturday, July 15, was the biggest day for final events with eight being held. Starting off the day was the BMX Dirt Final, where American Colton Walker claimed gold. Next up was the Moto X Step Up Final which ended with Australian Jarryd McNeil taking home the gold. In the third final event of the day, American Elliot Sloan won gold at the Skateboard Big Air Final. The fourth event of the day was the Skateboard Street Amateur Final. Seventeen year old American Jagger Eaton won the gold. The fifth final event of the day was the Men's Skateboard Street Final, which ended with Kelvin Hoefler of Brazil obtaining the gold. The Women's Skateboard Park Final followed, with thirteen year old American Brighton Zeuner winning gold, and becoming the youngest person ever to win gold at the X Games. The second to last event final of the day was the Moto X Best Whip Final. In this event, American Destin Cantrell won the gold. The final event, the Moto X Best Trick Final, resulted in New Zealander Levi Sherwood winning gold.

Sunday
Sunday, July 16, was the final day of the X Games, with four event finals left. The first final was the BMX Dirt Final, where American Colton Walker received the gold. At the second final, the Skatepark Skate Final, American Alex Sorgente won the gold. Australian Kyle Baldock won the "gold pedal" at the BMX Best Trick event. The final event of the X Games was the Moto X Quarterpipe High Air Final. In this final, American Colby Raha won the gold followed by American Tyler Bereman receiving the silver medal.

Results

Medal count

FINAL

Skateboard

BMX

Moto X

References

External links
X Games Website
X Games Minneapolis Website

X Games
2017 in sports in Minnesota
Festivals in Minnesota
July 2017 sports events in the United States
2017 in multi-sport events
2017 in American sports
2017 in motorcycle sport